The Westray Wife (also known as the Orkney Venus) is a small Neolithic figurine,  in height, carved from sandstone.  It was discovered during an Historic Scotland dig at the Links of Noltland, on Westray, Orkney, Scotland, in the summer of 2009. It was the first Neolithic carving of a human form to have been found in Scotland, and to date it is the earliest depiction of a face found in the United Kingdom.

A second figurine of about the same size and shape as the Westray Wife, but made from clay, and missing its head, was discovered by archaeologists at the same Links of Noltland site during the summer of 2010. This figurine,  in height, has a rectangular panel decorated with triangles on the front of its torso, which may represent a tunic, and a punched hole in the centre of its stomach. A number of small clay balls have also been discovered at the site, and it is possible that these were intended for use as heads for similar figurines. A third figurine was discovered in 2012.

It has been noted that the original figure's eyes bear a resemblance to "eyebrow motif" carvings found in a chambered cairn on the Holm of Papa. Archaeologist Richard  Strachan has said:

Despite the figurine's name, it is not certain that the Westray Wife does represent a female form, as the marks initially interpreted as breasts may in fact represent clothing fasteners and clothing fabric. The figurine was on display in the Westray Heritage Centre in Pierowall for the summer of 2010, and an enterprising local baker created "Westray Wifie" shortbread replicas for sale. In 2010 some local businesses reported a 45% increase in turnover since the discovery of the figurine.

See also
 List of Stone Age art
 Venus figurines

References

2009 in Scotland
Prehistoric Orkney
Neolithic Scotland
Sculptures in Scotland
Stone sculptures
Sandstone sculptures
Westray
2009 archaeological discoveries